Ali Newaz Mahmud Khaiyam is a Bangladesh Nationalist Party politician and a former Member of Parliament representing the Rajbari-1 constituency.

Career
Khaiyam was elected to parliament from Rajbari-1 as a Bangladesh Nationalist Party candidate in 2001. He received 95,266 votes while his nearest rival Kazi Keramat Ali of Awami League received 85,057 votes. He is the President of the Rajbari District unit of Bangladesh Nationalist Party.

Khaiyam supported Abdul Mannan Bhuiyan, General Secretary of Bangladesh Nationalist Party, against Khaleda Zia, Chairperson of the Party, and backed the fraction in favor of reforms during the caretaker government rule. In November 2007, a contractor filed an extortion case against Khaiyam at the Tejgaon Police Station in which he alleged Khaiyam demanded 2 million taka from him for a contract to work on Daulatdia Ferry Ghat. He was arrested from Kakrail in Dhaka. On 15 November 2007, he was sent to jail from detention.

Khaiyam lost the election from Rajbari-1 as a Bangladesh Nationalist Party candidate in 2008 and received 83,933 votes.

Khaiyam was the President of Rajbari District unit of Bangladesh Nationalist Party in 2014. He boycotted the national election that year as per the decision of the Bangladesh Nationalist Party.

Khaiyam received the Bangladesh Nationalist Party nomination for the 11th parliamentary election from Rajbari-1 for in 2018. He lost the election with 33,000 votes while Kazi Keramat Ali of Awami League won with 238,914 votes.

Khaiyam led a protest in Rajbari District against inflation in March 2022. He protested the arrest of Sonia Akter Sriti, a Mohila Dal leader, on a Digital Security Act for posting derogatory remarks against Prime Minister Sheikh Hasina.

References

Living people
People from Rajbari District
Bangladesh Nationalist Party politicians
8th Jatiya Sangsad members
Year of birth missing (living people)